Persley railway station served the area of Persley, Aberdeenshire, Scotland, from 1903 to 1937 on the Great North of Scotland Railway.

History 
The station was opened on 1 June 1903 by the Great North of Scotland Railway. The station building was on the eastbound platform. 'Halt' was added to its name on 16 July 1926. The station closed on 3 April 1937 with the withdrawal of the suburban train service.

References

External links 

Disused railway stations in Aberdeenshire
Former Great North of Scotland Railway stations
Railway stations in Great Britain opened in 1903
Railway stations in Great Britain closed in 1937
1903 establishments in Scotland
1937 disestablishments in Scotland